Peter P. Garibaldi (born September 12, 1931) is an American politician who served in the New Jersey General Assembly from 1968 to 1974 and in the New Jersey Senate from 1984 to 1988.

As mayor of Monroe Township, Middlesex County, New Jersey, Garibaldi argued that the township should not be split between two area codes and five Zip codes.

References

1931 births
Living people
Mayors of places in New Jersey
Republican Party New Jersey state senators
Republican Party members of the New Jersey General Assembly
People from Monroe Township, Middlesex County, New Jersey
Politicians from New Brunswick, New Jersey